Pinto Fútbol Sala was a futsal club based in Pinto, city of the autonomous community of Community of Madrid.

The club was founded in 1988 and her pavilion is Municipal de Pinto with capacity of 5,000 seaters.

The club was sponsored by Ayuntamiento de Pinto.

Season to season

2 season in División de Honor
4 seasons in División de Plata
1 season in 1ª Nacional A

Last squad

References

External links
Pinto FS Official Website 1 (not updated)
Pinto FS Official Website 2

Futsal clubs in Spain
Sports teams in the Community of Madrid
Futsal clubs established in 1988
Sports clubs disestablished in 2010
1988 establishments in Spain
2010 disestablishments in Spain